The 2019–20 Notre Dame Fighting Irish men's ice hockey season was the 60th season of play for the program and the 3rd season in the Big Ten Conference. The Fighting Irish represented the University of Notre Dame and were coached by Jeff Jackson, in his 15th season.

Roster

As of September 12, 2019.

Standings

Schedule and Results

|-
!colspan=12 style=";" | Exhibition

|-
!colspan=12 style=";" | Regular Season

|-
!colspan=12 style=";" | 

|- align="center" bgcolor="#e0e0e0"
|colspan=12|Notre Dame Lost Series 1–2

Scoring Statistics

Goaltending statistics

Rankings

Players drafted into the NHL

2020 NHL Entry Draft

† incoming freshman

References

External links

Notre Dame Fighting Irish men's ice hockey seasons
Notre Dame Fighting Irish 
Notre Dame Fighting Irish 
Notre Dame Fighting Irish 
Notre Dame Fighting Irish